Flying Doesn't Help is a solo album by Anthony Moore (credited on the album sleeve as 'A. More'), released by Quango in 1979. The album was remastered and re-released on CD by the Voiceprint label in 1994.

The Moore/Blegvad song, "War" was originally recorded in 1974 by Henry Cow and Slapp Happy, and released on their 1975 album, In Praise of Learning.

Track listing

Personnel
Anthony Moore - vocals, guitars, keyboards, electronics, backing vocals
Bob Shilling, Chris Slade, Robert Vogel, Charles Hayward - drums
Festus, Sam Harley, Matt Irving - bass
Bernie Clark - keyboards
Laurie Latham - saxophone, mouth harp, backing vocals
Edwin Cross - backing vocals

Produced by Anthony Moore and Laurie Latham
Engineered by Laurie Latham and Edwin Cross
Remastered for CD by Tony Arnold

Reviews

"Building dense sonic forests filled with jagged splinters and dry, incongruously delicate vocals, the results fall somewhere between Peter Gabriel, John Cale, David Bowie and Kevin Ayers. An extraordinary record that reveals itself a little further each time it's played." – Trouser Press

"While much of Moore's earlier work is pleasant, yet dispensable, Flying Doesn't Help falls into a different class altogether. Elaborate yet accessible, the effects of More's (now minus one "o") masterwork can be felt on a number of levels." – All Music

Variations
The album was released with at least three different colored covers—Red (as shown above), Purple and Yellow.

References

1979 albums
Anthony Moore albums
Albums produced by Laurie Latham